Lee Won-suk (born October 21, 1986) is a South Korean professional baseball infielder currently playing for the Samsung Lions of Korean Professional Baseball League.

He qualified for the FA after the 2016 season. On November 21, 2016, he signed an FA contract for 2.7 billion won, including 1.5 billion won in four-year down payment and 300 million won in annual salary.

References

External links
Career statistics and player information from Korea Baseball Organization

Lee Won-suk at Doosan Bears Baseball Club 

Doosan Bears players
KBO League infielders
South Korean baseball players
Lotte Giants players
Samsung Lions players
Sportspeople from Gwangju
1986 births
Living people